Robert Steele & Company was a shipbuilder based in Greenock, Scotland, formed in 1815 by Robert Steele (1745-1830) and two sons.  It followed dissolution of an earlier shipbuilding partnership between Robert Steele and John Carswell, known as "Steele and Carswell."
The first vessel the company built was the three-masted barque Rebecca.  The company was one of the shipbuilders credited with the development of the four-masted barque along with Alexander Stephen and Sons.

The company built twenty China tea clippers, many of which won China Tea Races.

The following are some of the Tea Clippers built by Robert Steele and company:

From 1854 the company started building iron ships, such as Irish ferry, ss Mangerton, an 1855 Robert Steele steamship, which struck wooden barque Josephine Willis in 1856

References

Defunct shipbuilding companies of Scotland
British companies established in 1815
1815 establishments in Scotland
Manufacturing companies established in 1815